Benign hypertension or benign essential hypertension are historical terms that are considered misleading, as hypertension is never benign, and consequently they have fallen out of use (see history of hypertension). The terminology persisted in the International Classification of Disease (ICD9), but is not included in the current ICD10.

References

Hypertension